Purley Oaks railway station is in the London Borough of Croydon in south London, on the Brighton Main Line  measured from . All trains serving it are operated by Southern and it is in London Travelcard Zone 6. The station has four platforms: a disused side platform on the up fast line, an island platform with a disused face on the down fast line and an eastern face used by up trains, and a side platform on the eastern side used by down trains. There is also a pay-and-display car park at the station.

The ticket office (staffed for part of the day) is on the island platform with two self-service ticket machines in the subway beneath the station.

A short walk away from Purley Oaks is Sanderstead railway station, also in Zone 6, with services to Victoria and East Grinstead.

History

The station was opened by the London Brighton and South Coast Railway on 5 November 1899 as part of the improvements to the main line and the opening of the Quarry Line.

Platform 1 was gutted by fire in 1989, destroying Croydon Model Railway Society's clubrooms.

On Saturday 4 March 1989, it was affected by the Purley station rail crash.

Services 

All services at Purley Oaks are operated by Southern using  EMUs.

The typical off-peak service in trains per hour is:

There is one morning service from Gatwick Airport, which runs to London Victoria.

On Sundays, there is a half-hourly service between London Bridge and Caterham only. Passengers for Tattenham Corner have to change at Purley.

References

External links

Railway stations in the London Borough of Croydon
Former London, Brighton and South Coast Railway stations
Railway stations in Great Britain opened in 1899
Railway stations served by Govia Thameslink Railway